Evergestis nomadalis is a species of moth in the family Crambidae. It is found in Greece, Russia, Turkey, Turkmenistan and Iran.

The wingspan is 31–33 mm. Adults are on wing in late summer.

References

Moths described in 1871
Evergestis
Moths of Asia
Moths of Europe